Gwydir Castle is situated in the Conwy valley, Wales, a mile to the west of the ancient market town of Llanrwst and  to the south of the large village of Trefriw.  An example of a fortified manor house dating back to c1500, it is located on the edge of the floodplain of the river Conwy, and overlooked from the west by the now-forested slopes of Gwydir Forest.

Etymology
The name 'Gwydir' likely derives from a contraction of Gwy-dir, "water land," the site long being subject to flooding from the nearby river Conwy. Another suggestion is that it might derive from Gwaed-dir, "the bloody land,", this having been the scene of some battles as detailed below. Any similarity with the Welsh word gwydr (glass) is coincidental.

History
There have been fortifications associated with this site since AD 600. In the Early Middle Ages numerous skirmishes were fought in the area between the post-Roman kingdoms of Wales. Two significant encounters were in AD 610,when Llywarch Hen, a bardic prince of Rheged, fought a bloody battle nearby and later when the Kingdoms of Gwynedd and Deheubarth fought a major battle near Llanrwst in AD 954 .

By the 14th century, the Welsh knight Hywel Coetmor, who had fought in the Hundred Years' War as a commander of longbowmen under Edward, the Black Prince at the Battle of Poitiers in 1356 is recorded as the first owner of a manor house on the site. He would later go onto support the rising led by  Owain Glyndŵr.

By the 16th century, Gwydir had become the seat of the powerful Wynn family who were descendants of the Kings of Gwynedd. The Wynns were one of the most significant families of north Wales during the Tudor and Stuart periods.

Following the Wars of the Roses, the castle was rebuilt by Meredith ap Ieuan ap Robert, the founder of the Wynn dynasty. The house incorporated re-used mediaeval material from the dissolved Abbey of Maenan. The square turret at the rear of the Solar Tower contains a spiral staircase taken from the Abbey and many elaborately carved stones can also be seen. The turret was added around 1540 and John Wyn ap Maredudd's initials can be seen above the main entrance in the courtyard gatehouse along with the date of 1555. The surviving buildings date from around the year 1500, and there were alterations and additions in c1540, c1600 and c1828, the latter after Lord Willoughby had done a fair bit of demolishing in c1819.

Although called a castle, it is an example of a Tudor architecture courtyard house or fortified manor house, rather than a traditional castle, such as those built in North Wales by Llywelyn the Great and Edward I.

Gwydir was home to Katheryn of Berain. King Charles is said to have visited Gwydir in 1645 as the guest of Sir Richard Wynn, 2nd Baronet, Treasurer to Queen Henrietta Maria, and Groom of the Royal Bed Chamber.

More recently King George V and Queen Mary stayed here as the Duke and Duchess of York, in April 1899.

Gwydir estate

In 1678 it passed by marriage to the Barons Willoughby de Eresby (when Mary Wynn married Robert Bertie, 1st Duke of Ancaster and Kesteven, then Lord Willoughby de Eresby), based in Lincolnshire (Dukes of Ancaster and Kesteven in 1715-1779, and from 1892 Earls of Ancaster). This land, however, was mostly mountainous and of poor quality, and although there were some 30 slate mines on the land, of varying sizes, this slate was not of a particularly good standard, much of it more suited to slabs than roofing slate. Nor was production high, and the output of all the quarries over the 150 years of their existence totalled, for instance, just two years' worth of output from the Blaenau Ffestiniog quarries. Prior to the arrival of the railway in the 1860s, most slate was carried by cart to the quays at Trefriw. The estate also owned a number of mineral mines, mostly in the area of today's Gwydir Forest.

The principle quarries on the Estate were located around Dolwyddelan where a syncline compressed the Nod Glas mudstones into slate veins. These were the Prince Llewellyn, Chwarel Ddu, Ty'n-y-bryn and Rhiw-goch quarries.

Much of the estate was, however, under continuous mortgage, and in 1894 Dolwyddelan was sold off, followed in the next two years by most of Llanrhychwyn and Trefriw. The sale of the house in 1921 by the Earl Carrington saw it passing out of inherited ownership for the first time in over 400 years, and virtually all other lands were subsequently sold off.

20th century
In 1921, the panelled main dining room from the 1640s was stripped, the carved and gilded panelling being bought at auction by William Randolph Hearst, the American press baron. On his death, the panels were inherited by the Metropolitan Museum of Art and until recently were kept in storage at the museum. The new owners of Gwydir, Peter Welford and Judy Corbett, traced these panels and negotiated with the museum, which sold the panels back to the Corbetts. They have been carefully replaced in their original setting, and the restored dining room was re-opened in July 1998 at a ceremony attended by the Prince of Wales.

In 1922 a fire broke out and gutted the Solar Tower, leaving it roofless. A subsequent fire in the West Wing made the place untenable, and it was abandoned, remaining unoccupied until 1944. In this year it was bought by Arthur Clegg, a retired bank manager, who, together with his wife and son, started a 20-year programme of renovation.

The castle is now privately owned by Peter Welford and his wife, Judy Corbett. They purchased the castle in 1994. They then began a programme of restoration to restore the 15th-century Tudor castle to its former glory. The story of the restoration is told in Judy Corbett's book Castles in the Air.

Gardens

The castle is set within a Grade 1 listed,  garden, which contains some ancient cedars — one of which was planted in 1625 to commemorate the wedding of King Charles I to Queen Henrietta Maria. One yew tree, known as the "Lovers Tree" or "Giant Yew", is estimated to be between 600 and 1000 years old, and therefore pre-dates the castle itself.

The raised terrace contains an imposing Renaissance arch, probably dating from the 1590s. The Old Dutch garden contains ancient yew topiary and an octagonal fountain. The Royal and Statesman's gardens contain Welsh Oaks planted during the royal visit of 1899, and in 1911. An Elizabethan causeway called the Chinese Walk runs across the fields to the River Conwy, where the remains of the Gwydir Quay can be seen. The River Conwy was tidal up to this point, but silting has limited most tides to below Gowers Bridge.

Gwydir Uchaf Chapel
Gwydir Uchaf Chapel, in the woods above Gwydir Castle, was built in 1673 by Sir Richard Wynn as a family memorial chapel for the Wynns of Gwydir. The simple exterior provides a direct contrast with its beautifully painted ceiling, depicting the Creation, the Trinity and the Last Judgement.

This chapel should not be confused with the one adjoining Llanrwst Church, called Gwydir Chapel. (This was built in 1633 by an earlier Sir Richard Wynn, and is said to have been designed by Inigo Jones. It has elaborate wood panelling, several family tombs and a stone coffin said to be that of Llywelyn ab Iorwerth, moved from Maenan Abbey at the Dissolution.)  The chapel is still owned by the Willoughby family who were the hereditary owners of Gwydir Castle. It is now managed by Cadw.

See also
List of gardens in Wales
 Grey Mare's Tail
 Wynn baronets
 Baron Gwydyr

References

 Gwydir Castle — A Brief History and Guide, by Peter Welford, 2000
 Gwydir Castle Published by Arthur Clegg.
 Gwydir Slate Quarries, by M.C. Williams & M.J.T. Lewis, 1989
 Castles in the Air, by Judy Corbett, Ebury Press, 2004
 Gwydir Castle Guidebook

External links

 Official Gwydir Castle site
 BBC News – Castle restoration marks 10 years Retrieved 13 February 2012
 The Independent – 'We slept rough and battled wild animals to restore a Welsh castle' 
 Illustrated guide to Gwydir Castle
 history with a movie
 Gwydir Chapel
 www.geograph.co.uk : photos of Gwydir Castle and surrounding area

Trefriw
Castles in Conwy County Borough
Country houses in Wales
Grade I listed buildings in Conwy County Borough
Houses in Conwy County Borough
Registered historic parks and gardens in Conwy County Borough